Claire or Clair  is a given name of French origin. The word means clear in French in its feminine form.

Its popularity in the United Kingdom peaked during the 1970s and 1980s; in 1974 it was the second most popular female first name and in 1984 was still sixth, but by 1997 it had fallen out of the top 100 after several years of sharply declining popularity.

The name was traditionally considered male, specifically when spelt Clair; however, it is now commonly used as a female name and is usually spelled Claire.

Women
Claire-Clémence de Maillé-Brézé (1628–1694), French noblewoman and wife of Louis, Grand Condé
Princess Claire of Belgium (born 1974)
 Claire Adams (1898–1978), Canadian actress
 Claire Adjiman, French academic
 Claire Armitstead, British journalist
 Claire Backhouse-Sharpe (born 1958), Canadian badminton player
 Claire Baker (born 1971), British politician
 Claire Bloom (born 1931), English actress
 Claire Boucher (born 1988), Canadian musician better known by her stage name Grimes
 Claire Bouchet (born 1954), French politician
 Claire Bouilhac (born 1970), French bande dessinée illustrator, scriptwriter, and colorist
 Claire Buffie (born 1986), American photographer
 Claire Byrne (born 1975), Irish journalist and television presenter 
 Claire Calvert (born 1988), English ballet dancer
 Claire Chazal (born 1956), French journalist
 Claire Coffee (born 1980), American actress
 Claire Corlett (born 1999), Canadian actress
 Claire Cottrill (born 1998), American musician known by her stage name Clairo
 Claire Coutinho (born 1985), British politician
 Claire Cox (born 1975), British actress
 Claire Cunningham (born 1977), Scottish choreographer
 Claire Cupples, Canadian microbiologist
 Claire Danes (born 1979), American actress
 Claire dela Fuente (1958–2021), Filipino singer and businesswoman
 Claire Dodd (1911–1973), American actress 
 Claire Donahue (born 1989), American swimmer
 Claire Emslie (born 1994), Scottish footballer
 Claire Etcherelli (1934–2023), French novelist
 Claire Fahey (born 1991), British real tennis player
 Claire Finkelstein, American professor at the University of Pennsylvania Law School
 Claire Forlani (born 1972), English actress
 Claire Fox (born 1960), British journalist, writer and politician
 Claire Foy (born 1984), English actress
 Claire Guion-Firmin (born 1957), French politician
 Claire Hodgkins (1929–2011), American virtuoso violinist
 Claire Holt (born 1988), Australian actress
 Claire Hooper (born 1976), Australian comedian
 Claire Ighodaro, British-born Nigerian chartered management accountant
 Claire IsaBelle (born 1962), Canadian politician
 Claire Janowski, American retired politician from Connecticut
 Claire Kerrane (born 1992), Irish Sinn Féin politician
 Claire Lacombe (1765–1826), French actress
 Claire Lomas (born 1980), British campaigner, fundraiser and former event rider
 Claire Lovett (1910–2005), Canadian badminton and tennis player
 Claire Martin, people of the same name:
 Claire Martin (1914–2014), pseudonym of Canadian author Claire Montreuil
 Claire Martin, British-born television weather presenter, now living in Canada
 Claire Martin (born 1967), British jazz singer
 Claire McCardell (1905–1958), American fashion designer 
 Claire McCaskill (born 1953), American politician from Missouri
 Claire Moore, people of the same name:
 Claire Moore (born 1960), British singer and actress
 Claire Moore (born 1956), Australian politician
 Claire Julie de Nanteuil (1834-1897), French writer
 Claire O'Petit (born 1949), French politician
 Claire Rayner (1931–2010), English journalist and agony aunt
 Claire Rutter (born 1976), English soprano 
 Claire Perry (born 1964), British politician
 Claire Pitollat (born 1979), French politician
 Claire Saffitz (born 1986), pastry chef, Youtube personality, contributing editor to Bon Appétit
 Claire Skinner (born 1965), British actress
 Claire Sterling (1919–1995), American author and journalist
 Claire Sugden (born 1986), British politician
 Claire Summers, Welsh news presenter
 Claire Tiltman (1977–1993), English murder victim
 Claire Vallée (born 1980), French chef
 Claire Waldoff (1884–1957), German singer
 Claire Wallace (1900/1906–1968), Canadian journalist and broadcaster
 Claire Ward (born 1972), British politician
 Claire Williams, people of the same name:
 Claire Williams (born 1976), British motorsport executive and former deputy team principal of Williams Racing
 Claire Williams (born 1987), Welsh paralympian athlete

Fictional characters
 Clair in the Pokémon universe
Claire in the 2010 video game Professor Layton and the Lost Future
 Claire Bennet in the TV series Heroes
 Claire Dearing, protagonist in the movie Jurassic World
 Claire Dunphy in the TV series Modern Family
 Claire Farron, aka Lightning, protagonist in the video game Final Fantasy XIII and its second sequel Lightning Returns: Final Fantasy XIII
 Dr. Claire Finn in the TV series The Orville
 Claire Fisher in the TV series Six Feet Under
 Claire Foley in the Professor Layton universe
 Claire Fraser, the heroine of the Outlander novel series and TV series
 Clair Huxtable in the TV series The Cosby Show
 Claire Kincaid in the TV series Law & Order
 Claire Kyle in the TV series My Wife and Kids
 Claire Littleton in the TV series Lost
 Claire Lowell, a character in the American sitcom television series Kate & Allie
 Claire Lyons in the novel series The Clique 

 Claire Novak in the TV series Supernatural
 Claire Nuñez, a main character in Trollhunters: Tales of Arcadia
Claire Peacock in the TV series Coronation Street
 Claire Redfield in the video game series Resident Evil
 Claire Riesen in the TV series Dominion
 Claire Setilan, an antagonist in the video game Magna Carta 2
 Claire Standish in the film The Breakfast Club
 Claire Temple in the TV series Daredevil
 Claire Underwood in the TV series House of Cards
 Claire Wheeler, Greek Council President in the Pixar film Monsters University

Men
 Claire Alexander (born 1945), Canadian professional ice hockey player
 Clair Bee (1896-1983), American basketball coach and sports novelist
 Lt. Gen. Claire Lee Chennault (1893–1958), American aviator, commander of the Flying Tigers
 Clair George (1930–2011), veteran officer of the Central Intelligence Agency
 Clair Huffaker (1926–1990), American author
 Claire E. Hutchin Jr. (1916-1980), United States Army lieutenant general
 Claire Egtvedt (1892–1975), American airplane designer 
 Claire Frye (1899–1971), American college football player
 Claire Konold (born 1938), American politician 
 Claire L. Straith (1891–1958), American plastic surgeon
 Claire Lawrence (b. 1939), Canadian musician with the band Chilliwack and music producer
 Clair Cameron Patterson (1922–1995), American geochemist, developer of the lead-lead isotopic dating method who calculated the age of the Earth as 4.55 billion years
 Clair Nelson (1940-2019), American politician, farmer, and businessman

Fictional character
 Claire Stanfield in the light novel series Baccano!

See also
Clara (given name)
Clare (given name)
Claire (disambiguation)

References

Given names
French feminine given names
English feminine given names
English masculine given names
English-language feminine given names